Claude Heymann (13 November 1907 – 13 April 1994) was a French screenwriter and film director.

Selected filmography
 American Love (1931)
 Idylle au Caire (1933)
 The Brighton Twins (1936)
 Paris-New York (1940)
 Jericho (1946)
 Counter Investigation (1947)
 Crossroads of Passion (1948)
 Victor (1951)
 The Beautiful Image (1951)
 Darling Anatole (1954)

References

Bibliography
 Frey, Hugo. Louis Malle. Manchester University Press, 2004.

External links

1907 births
1994 deaths
20th-century French screenwriters
Film directors from Paris